Kuusamo Airport  is an airport in Kuusamo, Finland.

Airlines and destinations

Statistics

See also 
List of the largest airports in the Nordic countries

References

External links 

 Finavia – Kuusamo Airport
 AIP Finland – Kuusamo Airport
 
 
 

Airports in Finland
Airport
Buildings and structures in North Ostrobothnia
International airports in Finland